6th parallel may refer to:

6th parallel north, a circle of latitude in the Northern Hemisphere
6th parallel south, a circle of latitude in the Southern Hemisphere